Radio broadcasting in Sri Lanka dates to 1923. Radio broadcasting, like other forms of media in Sri Lanka, is generally divided along linguistic lines with state and private media operators providing services in Sinhala, Tamil, and English language.

History
The first radio broadcast in Ceylon was in 1923 when recorded music was broadcast using parts of radio equipment from a captured German submarine. Regular broadcasting started in Colombo in July 1924. Ceylon's first radio station Radio Colombo started regular broadcasting on 16 December 1925. The station was taken over by the British military during World War II who renamed the station Radio SEAC which broadcast across South Asia from October 1944. After the war the station was handed back to the civilian government of Ceylon who renamed it Radio Ceylon on 1 October 1949. The station was immensely popular both in Ceylon and other parts of Asia.

The Ceylon Broadcasting Corporation Act No. 37 of 1966 incorporated the Department of Broadcasting. Radio Ceylon became a public corporation on 30 September 1967, changing its name to Ceylon Broadcasting Corporation (CBC). Ceylon was renamed Sri Lanka in 1972 after becoming a republic and consequently CBC was renamed Sri Lanka Broadcasting Corporation (SLBC).

SLBC broadcast on medium wave until 1993 when FM broadcasting began. 95% of the country received FM transmissions by 1999. The government maintained a monopoly on radio broadcasting until the early 1990s when private radio stations were allowed to broadcast. Today there are numerous private radio stations but the state-owned stations continue to dominate the market.

Radio stations
The following is a list of radio stations based in Sri Lanka.

Terrestrial radio

Internet radio

International broadcasters
Several international broadcasters operate radio stations aimed at Sri Lankan audiences but broadcasting from outside Sri Lanka:
 All India Radio
 BBC World Service Sinhala Service (Sandeshaya)
 BBC World Service Tamil Service (Tamilosai)
 China Radio International Sinhala Service
 China Radio International Tamil Service
 Radio Veritas Asia

Some broadcasters use local transmitters to relay their broadcasts. Deutsche Welle broadcasts are relayed via Trincomalee on medium wave and short wave. Trans World Radio India broadcasts on medium wave using SLBC's transmitter in Puttalam. The International Broadcasting Bureau broadcasts programmes from Voice of America, Radio Azadi, Radio Free Afghanistan, Radio Free Asia, Radio Liberty and Radio Sawa on short wave using the relay station at Iranawila.

See also
List of Sri Lankan Broadcasters
List of Television in Sri Lanka
List of newspapers in Sri Lanka

References
 
 

 
Sri Lanka
Radio